The Ross Volunteer Company (commonly known as the Ross Volunteers or the RVs) is the military escort of the governor of Texas and a unit of the Texas A&M Corps of Cadets.

History

Establishment and early history
The Ross Volunteers were established as a military drill team at Texas A&M University in 1887 under the name Scott Volunteers, honoring Col. T.M. Scott, the university's business manager. In 1891 the name of the unit was changed to the Ross Volunteers in honor of university president Lawrence Sullivan Ross, and later changed to the Foster Guards, and then the Houston Rifles, reflecting the names of Ross' successors.  In 1905 the name was permanently set as the Ross Volunteers.

Later history
The unit was dormant during World War II but was reactivated in 1948. Among its first public engagements following its reconstitution was to escort Governor of Texas Beauford Jester and General Jonathan Wainwright to that year's Texas A&M vs University of Texas football game; the bearing and discipline of the unit was remarked upon by Wainwright. In 1950 the unit was named military escort to the governor of Texas, a role it continues to perform. In 1985, the Ross Volunteers were opened to female participation following a federal court order.

During the state funeral of George H. W. Bush, the Ross Volunteers formed the guard of honor during the removal of the casket from Bush's funeral train upon its arrival in College Station, Texas.
The Ross Volunteers are the oldest cadet organization in existence at Texas A&M University, though the now defunct Stephen F. Austin Literary Society and the Calliopean Literary Society were founded earlier.

Uniforms
Since inception, the uniform of the Ross Volunteers has consisted of white trousers and blouses with gold trim, worn with peaked hats. Officers wear a distinctive, crimson waist sash.

Organization 
The unit is broken into three of the following platoons based on height:
Tree Platoon
Meatball Platoon
Squat Platoon

Each platoon is further subdivided into four squads.

Notable personnel
 Andrew Davis Bruce, 3rd President of the University of Houston
 Pat Olsen, engineer and namesake of Olsen Field at Blue Bell Park.
 Russell Huebner
 Tyson Voelkel, President of the Texas A&M Foundation and Corps Commander from 1995-1996.
 Brigadier General Jake Betty, Commander of the Texas State Guard from 2014-2017.

Ross Volunteer Association 
Due to the efforts of RV alumni such as General Jake Betty and Colonel Byron Stebbins, the Ross Volunteer Association (RVA) was established in 2009 to support the RVs.

See also
 3rd Infantry Regiment
 National Lancers
 Texas Military Forces

Notes

References

Texas A&M University
Military units and formations established in 1887
Ceremonial units and formations
1887 establishments in Texas
Governor of Texas